The 7.5 cm Feldkanone 38 (7.5 cm FK 38) was a field gun used by Germany and Brazil in World War II. Built by Krupp to satisfy an order by the Brazilian Army some 64 were delivered before the war began. In 1942 the remainder of the order was completed and 80 were delivered to the Heer.

Design 
The FK 38 had a longer barrel than the 7.5 cm FK 18 that was fitted with a cylindrical muzzle brake. Originally this was an unusual 6 slot design, but it was later replaced by a standard German four port design. Early versions had wood-spoked wheels, but later models had pressed steel wheels with solid rubber tires and had sprung axles for motor transport. It used a semi-automatic version of the original breech mechanism and fixed ammunition instead of the original separate-loading rounds. These changes likely boosted its rate of fire over the FK 18 considerably.

Notes

References 
 Engelmann, Joachim and Scheibert, Horst. Deutsche Artillerie 1934-1945: Eine Dokumentation in Text, Skizzen und Bildern: Ausrüstung, Gliederung, Ausbildung, Führung, Einsatz. Limburg/Lahn, Germany: C. A. Starke, 1974
 Gander, Terry and Chamberlain, Peter. Weapons of the Third Reich: An Encyclopedic Survey of All Small Arms, Artillery and Special Weapons of the German Land Forces 1939-1945. New York: Doubleday, 1979 
 Hogg, Ian V. German Artillery of World War Two. 2nd corrected edition. Mechanicsville, PA: Stackpole Books, 1997 

World War II field artillery
World War II artillery of Germany
75 mm artillery
Military equipment introduced in the 1930s